Alien Sweetheart is an acoustic light rock album by the Belgian rock band Zornik. It was released in 2005 on EMI Belgium.

Track listing 
 "I Feel Alright" – 4:22
 "Keep Me Down" – 3:45
 "Monday Afternoon" – 4:20
 "Another Year" – 4:35
 "Escape" – 4:10
 "Wake Up" – 3:22
 "Things Are Changing" – 4:28
 "So Much More to Come" – 4:42
 "Hate/Like" – 4:03

Singles
"I Feel Alright"
"Keep Me Down"

References
Zornik: Alien Sweetheart

2005 albums
Zornik albums